Edward Barron Chandler  (August 22, 1800 – February 6, 1880) was a New Brunswick politician and lawyer from a United Empire Loyalist family.  He was one of the Fathers of Confederation.

Chandler was born in Amherst, Nova Scotia and moved to New Brunswick to study law.  He moved to Dorchester, New Brunswick and served in the colony's government. In 1827 he was elected to the New Brunswick legislature as an opponent of responsible government and later served on the province's Legislative Council (the legislature's Upper House) and in Cabinet serving as leader of the "compact" government that ruled the colony from 1848 to 1854 prior to the institution of responsible government.

In 1836 Chandler became a member of New Brunswick's Legislative Council.

Later, Chandler was a New Brunswick delegate to the  conferences in London, Charlottetown, and Quebec that led to Canadian confederation. Though he supported the federal Conservatives of Sir John A. Macdonald he was a cautious supporter who opposed a strong central government.

Chandler was a supporter of railway development and was instrumental as a federally appointed commissioner overseeing construction of the Intercolonial Railway in having its surveys diverted from a direct route between Amherst and Moncton to run through his community of Dorchester.  He also supported the policy of reciprocity with the United States. He refused an appointment to the Senate of Canada but accepted an appointment as the fifth  Lieutenant Governor of New Brunswick in 1878.  He died in Fredericton in 1880.

Chandler was a Freemason of Sussex Lodge, No. 480 (England).

Chandler's home in Dorchester, Chandler House or Rocklyn, was designated a National Historic Site of Canada in 1971.

See also
List of New Brunswick lieutenant-governors

External links 
Biography at the Dictionary of Canadian Biography Online

References

1800 births
1880 deaths
Canadian Anglicans
Canadian people of English descent
Fathers of Confederation
Lieutenant Governors of New Brunswick
People from Amherst, Nova Scotia
People from Westmorland County, New Brunswick
Persons of National Historic Significance (Canada)
Canadian Freemasons